Kul Bahadur Gurung is a Nepalese politician and leader of the Nepali Congress party. Gurung has worked as general secretary of the party. He had been Minister of Education in the cabinet of Girija Prasad Koirala in 1997.

Nepali Congress has raised Gurung as the candidate for the President Election 2015.
 
A resident of Ilam District, Gurung had fought for democracy and spent many years in jail for the same charge.
In the 2008 Constituent Assembly election he was elected to the assembly from the Ilam-3 constituency, winning 16,286 votes. At 73 years, Gurung was the oldest assembly member elected through the First Past the Post system. He was the acting chairman of the Constituent Assembly until the election of Subhas Chandra Nemwang to the post. The first session of the first Constitution Assembly chaired by Gurung ended the 270 years old monarchy in Nepal and declared Republic.

In July 2008, there were reports that Gurung is associated with a dissident tendency inside the Nepali Congress.

See also 
 Gurung

References

Education ministers
Living people
Nepali Congress politicians from Koshi Province
Education ministers of Nepal
Nepalese Buddhists
1935 births
Nepal MPs 1994–1999
Gurung people
Members of the 1st Nepalese Constituent Assembly
Members of the 2nd Nepalese Constituent Assembly
Candidates for President of Nepal